Johann Jacob Haid or Johann Jakob Haid (1704–1767) was a German engraver who worked in Augsburg.

Life and works
Haid came from a German family of artists and engravers and was known for large mezzotint portraits.

He worked in England, and it has been suggested that he borrowed from the work of Robert Robinson (c. 1651 – 1706), who was a popular English mezzotint engraver, painter, and stage designer.

Haid also produced botanical work after  (1678–1754) and with Johann Elias Ridinger, and worked on Johann Wilhelm Weinmann's "Phytanthoza iconographia".

References

External links

1704 births
1767 deaths
Engravers from Augsburg